Katarzyna Felusiak (born 12 December 1973) is a Polish fencer. She competed in the women's foil events at the 1992 and 1996 Summer Olympics.

References

External links
 

1973 births
Living people
Polish female fencers
Olympic fencers of Poland
Fencers at the 1992 Summer Olympics
Fencers at the 1996 Summer Olympics
Sportspeople from Gdańsk
21st-century Polish women
20th-century Polish women